María Julia "Maju" Mantilla García (born 10 July 1984) is a Peruvian actress, dancer, model, teacher and beauty queen who won Miss World 2004 in China.

Early life
Born in Trujillo, Mantilla is the younger of two daughters of Olmedo Lucio Mantilla Mayer and Elvia Elizabeth García Linares. She was studying to become a high school teacher and planned to start a second degree in Tourism. One of her dreams was to own an online tourism company to promote her native town and country all over the world. Her city, Trujillo, is a mixture of colonial and pre-Columbian architecture.

In 2001, Mantilla became the Peruvian national champion of Triathlon and Pentathlon, and was elected national athlete of the year. She is a professional dancer in The Marinera, a typical local dance. With a group of ladies, she developed a program in Trujillo to give breakfast to hundreds of children in poor areas. She is a professional dancer.

Miss Peru
In 2004, she was Miss La Libertad and won the right to represent Peru in the Miss World contest as runner-up to Liesel Holler (Miss Peru Universe 2004) and was one of the major favorites in the run-up to the pageant, which was decided by a global television/telephone/online vote. Popularly known in her country as "Maju" Mantilla, her aunt María Julia Mantilla Mayer was Miss Peru 1969.

Miss World 2004
On 4 December 2004, in the Beauty Crown Theatre located in the Chinese beach city of Sanya, she was crowned Miss World 2004 by the winner from the year before, Rosanna Davison of Ireland, becoming the second winner from Peru since Madeline Hartog-Bel in 1967. She was also crowned Miss World Americas.

Mantilla was a record breaker for Peru during the competition, and was among the semifinalists in three fast track events. In Miss World Sports, she tied for third place with Kenisha Thom of Trinidad and Tobago. In Miss World Talent, she was among the Top 25 semifinalists with a traditional Peruvian dance, The Marinera Norteña. And finally, in Contestants' Choice, she placed second runner-up.

Claudia Cruz of Dominican Republic and Nancy Randall of the United States were the first and second runners-up, respectively. Other contestants who made it into the final five were 20-year-old Karla Bautista of the Philippines, and 19-year-old Katarzyna Borowicz of Poland.

During her reign, Mantilla performed a variety of duties focused on fundraising for charitable organizations. She traveled to Indonesia, Russia, Peru, United States, Czech Republic, China, Tibet, Ireland, United Kingdom and many other countries during her reign.

On 10 December 2005, she crowned her successor, Unnur Vilhjálmsdóttir of Iceland.

References

External links
 Maria Julia Mantilla Garcia's official website
 Miss World official website
 Maju Mantilla Fans Site

1984 births
Living people
Peruvian people of German descent
Peruvian people of Italian descent
Peruvian people of Spanish descent
Peruvian child models
Peruvian beauty pageant winners
Peruvian female models
Peruvian female triathletes
Miss World 2004 delegates
Miss World winners
People from Trujillo, Peru